The 2018 Dubai Tour was a road cycling stage race that took place in Dubai between 6 and 10 February 2018. It was the fifth edition of the Dubai Tour and was rated as a 2.HC event as part of the 2018 UCI Asia Tour.

Route

Stages

Stage 1

Stage 2

Stage 3
Race leader Dylan Groenewegen received a 20-second penalty for sheltering too long behind a team car.

Stage 4

Stage 5

Classification leadership table
In the 2018 Dubai Tour, four different jerseys were awarded. For the general classification, calculated by adding each cyclist's finishing times on each stage, and allowing time bonuses for the first three finishers at intermediate sprints and at the finish of mass-start stages, the leader received a blue jersey. This classification was considered the most important of the 2018 Dubai Tour, and the winner of the classification was considered the winner of the race.

Additionally, there was a points classification, which awarded a red jersey. In the points classification, cyclists received points for finishing in the top 10 in a stage. For winning a stage, a rider earned 25 points, with 16 for second, 11 for third, 8 for fourth, 6 for fifth with a point fewer per place down to a single point for 10th place. Points towards the classification could also be accrued at intermediate sprint points during each stage; these intermediate sprints also offered bonus seconds towards the general classification. There was also a sprints classification for the points awarded at the aforementioned intermediate sprints, where the leadership of which was marked by a jersey in the colours of the United Arab Emirates flag.

The fourth jersey represented the young rider classification, marked by a white jersey. This was decided in the same way as the general classification, but only riders born after 1 January 1993 were eligible to be ranked in the classification.

Final classifications

References

External links
 

2018
2018 in Emirati sport
2018 UCI Asia Tour